Reefer may refer to:

Art, entertainment, and media
 Reefer (band), a hip-hop duo consisting of Nicholas Thorburn and Daddy Kev
 Reefer, a newspaper's front-page paragraph referring to a story on an inside page

Type of pursuit
 Reefer, an aquarium hobbyist who keeps corals, sea anemones, and other invertebrates associated with coral reefs
 Reefer, a midshipman engaged in sail reefing

Transportation
 Reefer ship, a refrigerated ship
 Refrigerated container, used for intermodal cargo
 Refrigerated van, a refrigerated railway wagon (European practice)
 Refrigerator car, a refrigerated railroad boxcar (US practice)
 Refrigerator truck, a temperature-controlled van, truck or semi-trailer
, a pilot schooner purchased by the United States Navy for a dispatch boat during the Mexican–American War

Other uses
 Reefer, a slang term for cannabis
 Reefer jacket, a type of jacket for midshipmen reefing sails

See also
Refer (disambiguation)